Ugolnoye is a rural locality (a selo), the only inhabited locality, and the administrative center of Ugolninsky Rural Okrug of Verkhnekolymsky District in the Sakha Republic, Russia, located  from Zyryanka, the administrative center of the district. Its population as of the 2010 Census was 329, of whom 176 were male and 153 female, down from 580 recorded during the 2002 Census.

References

Notes

Sources
Official website of the Sakha Republic. Registry of the Administrative-Territorial Divisions of the Sakha Republic. Verkhnekolymsky District. 

Rural localities in Verkhnekolymsky District